The Singer Bowl was the former name for a stadium in the northeastern United States, located in Flushing Meadows–Corona Park in the New York City borough of Queens. It was an early example of naming rights in large venues.

History 
The stadium was designed by Eggers & Higgins and intended to be a temporary structure. It opened in 1964, built by the Singer Sewing Machine Company, and was donated for use at the  It was taken over by the New York City Department of Parks and Recreation after the conclusion of the fair. Later in the month, The Jimi Hendrix Experience and Big Brother and the Holding Company (with Janis Joplin) were also part of the festival at the stadium. Two years after civil engineers judged its structure unsafe, the Singer Bowl was renovated by the Parks Department at a cost of $317,400 in 1971.

In the summer of 1972, professional boxing was held at the Singer Bowl. Some of the fighters who boxed there included heavyweight champion  and future world champions Vito Antuofermo and Saoul Mamby. Other boxers of note that fought at the Singer Bowl in 1972 were Edwin Viruet, John Clohessy, Roy Edmonds, Eduardo Santiago.

Tennis
In the early 1970s, the United States Tennis Association was looking for a new place to host the U.S. Open as relations with the West Side Tennis Club in Forest Hills, which had hosted the tournament, were breaking down. The USTA was initially unable to find a sufficient site, but the association's incoming president, W.E. Hester saw the old Singer Bowl from the window of an airplane flying into LaGuardia Airport. The long rectangular stadium was renamed the Louis Armstrong Memorial Stadium in 1973 after a famous Corona resident, jazz trumpeter Louis Armstrong.

Heavily renovated in 1977, it reopened in 1978 as two venues, Louis Armstrong Stadium, which had significantly more seating than the original stadium, and the adjacent Grandstand. Both were part of the present-day USTA National Tennis Center. When the USTA built Arthur Ashe Stadium next door in 1997, the largest tennis-only venue in the world, the seating capacity of Armstrong was reduced to be closer to its original format.

It was demolished in October 2016 as part of the Billie Jean King Tennis Center renovation.

References
Notes

Further reading
"Singer Bowl"

"Demolition of stadium"

External links
Streets You Crossed – Flushing the Bowl 

Former sports venues in New York City
Boxing venues in New York City
Tennis venues in New York City
Sports venues in Queens, New York
Sports venues completed in 1964
Flushing Meadows–Corona Park
1964 establishments in New York City
2016 disestablishments in New York (state)
Sports venues demolished in 2016